Ashcroft Manor Ranch, known also as Ashcroft Ranch, is an historic ranch in the Thompson Country of British Columbia, Canada, founded by Clement Francis Cornwall (later Lieutenant-Governor of British Columbia) and his brother, Henry Cornwall.  Ashcroft Manor's main house and buildings are an historic site adjacent to the Trans-Canada Highway and the Canadian Pacific mainline, which named its whistlestop at the current site of the village of Ashcroft after it, naming it Ashcroft Station.  The Ashcroft Manor is located on the Trans-Canada Hwy #1, at the junction for southern cutoff from the highway to the town of Ashcroft below on the Thompson River.

In the heyday of the Cornwall brothers, Ashcroft Manor was one of the centres of British-style country life in the British Columbia Interior, and was famous for its fox-hunting parties and line of hounds, as well as race horses, and drew the early province's high society to these and other entertainments.

Overlooking Ashcroft Manor to the north is the Cache Creek Waste Disposal Facility near the town of the same name.  The name Cornwall Hills, referring to the southern part of the low hill-range between the Thompson and the upper basin of Hat Creek is derived from that of the informal name of the ranch, the Cornwall Ranch.  The Cornwall name is shared by Cornwall Creek, a tributary of the Thompson River, entering it on the lower side of the ranch holdings.

See also
Cornwall Hills Provincial Park
List of historic ranches in British Columbia
Walhachin, British Columbia

References

External links
The Ashcroft Manor, Gold Country GeoTourism Program

Unincorporated settlements in British Columbia
Ranches in British Columbia
Populated places in the Thompson-Nicola Regional District
Thompson Country